Fackson Kapumbu (born 6 October 1990) is a Zambian international footballer who plays for ZESCO United, as a left-back.

Club career
Kapumbu began his career in 2010 with Lusaka-based side National Assembly, before signing for Zanaco in time for the 2013 Zambian Premier League season. Kapumbu later signed for ZESCO United ahead of the 2017 Zambian Premier League season.

On 1 November 2017, Kapumbu was nominated for the domestic African Footballer of the Year award by the Confederation of African Football.

International career
On 28 April 2013, Kapumbu made his debut for Zambia in a 2–0 win against Zimbabwe. On 16 July 2017, Kapumbu scored his first goal for Zambia in a 4–0 win against Swaziland.

International goals
Scores and results list Zambia's goal tally first.

Honours
Zanaco
Zambian Premier League: 2016

ZESCO United
Zambian Premier League: 2017

References

1990 births
Living people
People from Chingola
Zambian footballers
Association football defenders
Zambia international footballers
National Assembly F.C. players
Zanaco F.C. players
ZESCO United F.C. players
Zambia Super League players
Zambia A' international footballers
2018 African Nations Championship players